The Invasion is a 2007 American science fiction horror film directed by Oliver Hirschbiegel, with additional scenes written by The Wachowskis and directed by James McTeigue, and starring Nicole Kidman and Daniel Craig. The plot follows a psychiatrist (Kidman) in Washington, D.C. who finds those around her turning into emotionless beings shortly after a major Space Shuttle crash.

Development of the film began in 2004. Warner Bros. hired David Kajganich to write what was intended to be a remake of the 1956 film Invasion of the Body Snatchers, but Kajganich crafted a different story as an original conception and to reflect contemporary times. Principal photography began in September 2005. The film was released on August 17, 2007, to received mixed-to-negative reviews and grossed $40.2 million against a $65–80 million budget, making it a failure in the box office sales and loss for Warner Bros' $71 million projectors.

The Invasion is the fourth film adaptation of the 1955 novel The Body Snatchers by Jack Finney following Don Siegel's 1956 film Invasion of the Body Snatchers, Philip Kaufman's 1978 remake of the same name, and Abel Ferrara's 1993 film Body Snatchers.

Plot
After a Space Shuttle crashes on Earth, a fungus-like alien lifeform is discovered on the remaining parts scattered widely over the United States. Once people are infected by the organism, and REM sleep occurs, the organism takes control. One of the first people infected is Tucker Kaufman, a CDC director investigating the crash.

Tucker's ex-wife, psychiatrist Carol Bennell, begins to feel something is amiss when people seem to have "changed". Her patient, Wendy Lenk (played by Veronica Cartwright, who appeared in the 1978 film version as Nancy Bellicec), describes how her husband "is not (her) husband", and one of Carol's son's friends acts detached and emotionless.

At a neighborhood Halloween party, Carol's son Oliver finds an unusual patch of "skin" on a partier, which is initially believed to be costume makeup. Carol speculates that the skin may be connected to reports of a fast-spreading flu. Carol takes the sample to her doctor friend Ben Driscoll to have it analyzed. Carol and Oliver later witness a car accident where a troubled woman is killed. Carol approaches the crash scene to give a witness statement, but an emotionless cop takes down her plates and orders her back to her car. Afterwards, Carol drops Oliver off at Tucker's house for the weekend.

Later, that night, Ben and Carol attend a friendly dinner meeting between Russian diplomat Yorish and Czech diplomat Belicec (along with his wife Luddie). Carol and Yorish debate the violent nature of humans over caviar and champagne. Meanwhile, Tucker uses the CDC to spread the disease further, disguising the spores as flu vaccine and Carol, upon returning home, is attacked by a "census department" worker who tries to break into her house.

Ben and Dr. Stephen Galeano, a biologist, discover how the spore takes over the brain during REM sleep. During this investigation, Luddie calls Ben, worried about Yorish's behavior. Driscoll and Galeano also find that people who had brain-affecting illnesses, such as encephalitis or ADEM, are immune to the spore because their previous illnesses prevent the spore from "latching on" to the brain matter. Oliver is immune to the spore because of the ADEM he had as a young child. Carol decides to get her son, who might show a way to a cure, back from Tucker. Before she drives to Tucker's house, she joins Ben's team who is called to the house of the Belicecs, the Czech ambassador and his wife, in a case of emergency. There they witness the transformation of Yorish (the Russian ambassador) and the Belicecs' friend.

When Carol arrives at Tucker's house, he and several colleagues close in on her. He explains that the changed humans, devoid of irrational emotions, are offering a better world, and asks her to join them. When Carol resists, Tucker holds her to the ground and infects her by spurting his saliva on her. She escapes and returns to Ben at the Belicecs' house. They flee when Belicec returns with more transformed people intent on infecting anyone in the house.

Galeano and one of his assistants head to Fort Detrick in Frederick, Maryland, where they and other scientists will attempt to find a cure for the virus. Carol and Ben separate to find Oliver, who texts his location, the apartment of Tucker's mother, to Carol. Carol goes there and manages to spirit Oliver away, but is again pursued by Tucker, whom she has to kill to stop.

Carol arranges to meet up with Ben, but it takes a while for him to show, and Carol almost falls asleep, but Oliver saves her. Ben arrives, but Carol finds he too has 'converted'. He attempts to seduce her to give in to the new society that has no crime, war, or violence, but also frankly states that there is no room for people like Oliver who are immune. Carol shoots Ben in the leg and flees with Oliver. They are pursued, but finally she and Oliver are picked up by helicopter, and flown to the medical center. A vaccine is created, inoculations are made world-wide, and within a year the alien virus is eliminated. Carol and Ben reunite, Ben having no memory of the events, and society reverts to its normal emotional and violent ways.

Cast

Production

Conception
In March 2004, Warner Bros. hired David Kajganich to write a script that would serve as a remake of the 1956 science fiction film Invasion of the Body Snatchers. In July 2005, Oliver Hirschbiegel was attached to direct, with production to begin in Edgemere, Maryland. The following August, Nicole Kidman was cast to star in the film, then titled Invasion, receiving a salary of close to $17 million. Invasion was based on the script by Kajganich, originally intended as a remake of Invasion of the Body Snatchers, but Kajganich crafted a different enough story for the studio to see the project as an original conception. Kajganich described the story to reflect contemporary times, saying, "You just have to look around our world today to see that power inspires nothing more than the desire to retain it and to eliminate anything that threatens it." The screenwriter said that the story was set in Washington, D.C. to reflect the theme. In August, Daniel Craig was cast opposite Kidman in the lead. The film, whose original title Invasion of the Body Snatchers was shortened to Invasion due to Kajganich's different concept, was changed once more to The Visiting so it would not be confused with ABC's TV series Invasion.

Filming
Filming began on September 26, 2005 in Baltimore and lasted 45 days. Filming also took place in Washington, D.C., including in the Cleveland Park Metro station, outside the Foggy Bottom–GWU Metro station, and in Dupont Circle. The film had minimal visual effects, with no need for greenscreen work. Instead, the director shot from odd camera angles and claustrophobic spaces to increase tension in the film. In October 2006, the title was changed from The Visiting to The Invasion, due to the cancellation of the ABC TV series. The studio, however, was unhappy with Hirschbiegel's results and hired The Wachowskis to rewrite the film and assist with additional shooting. The studio later hired director James McTeigue to perform re-shoots that would cost $10 million and for which McTeigue would not be credited. After 13 months of inactivity, re-shoots took place in January 2007 to increase action scenes and add a twist ending. The re-shoot lasted for 17 days in Los Angeles. During the re-shooting, Kidman was involved in an accident, while in a Jaguar that was being towed by a stunt driver and was taken to a hospital briefly. Kidman broke several ribs, but she was able to get back to work soon after being hospitalized.

Musical score
In May 2007, composer John Ottman recorded the musical score for The Invasion, using heavy synthesizers combined with a 77-piece orchestra intended to create "otherworldly foreboding and tension".  The music was also designed to have an avant-garde postmodern style, with atmospheric and thrilling action elements.

Release
The Invasion was originally intended to be released in June 2006, but it was postponed to 2007. The film was released on August 17, 2007 in the United States and Canada in 2,776 theaters.

Promotion
The music in the trailer is called "Untitled 8 (a.k.a. "Popplagið")" by Sigur Rós.

Box office
The film grossed $5,951,409 over the opening weekend. The Invasion grossed $15,074,191 in the United States and Canada and $24,727,542 in other territories for a worldwide gross of $40,170,558 .

Critical reception
On review aggregator Rotten Tomatoes, The Invasion holds an approval rating of 20% based on 164 reviews, with an average rating of 4.40/10. The critical consensus reads: "The Invasion is slickly made, but it lacks psychological insight and thrills." On review aggregator Metacritic, The Invasion received an average score of 45 out of 100.

Roger Ebert of the Chicago Sun-Times called it "the fourth, and the least, of the movies made from Jack Finney's classic science fiction novel." Owen Gleiberman of Entertainment Weekly wrote that it was "a soulless rehash...The movie isn't terrible; it's just low-rent and reductive." Joanne Kaufman of The Wall Street Journal added, "With all the shoot-outs, the screaming, the chases, collisions and fireballs, there isn't much time for storytelling."

Manohla Dargis of The New York Times criticized the film, writing: "The latest and lamest version of Invasion of the Body Snatchers might have been an accidental camp classic if its politics weren't so abhorrent and the movie didn't try to hide its ineptitude behind a veil of pomposity." Paul Arendt of the BBC wrote: "Having established an effectively creepy mood in the first half, the film eventually degenerates into a muddled mess, with Nicole and Daniel Craig dodging zombies while popping amphetamines in a desperate effort to stay awake. We know how they feel." Maitland McDonagh of TV Guide called the film "a frantic mess that opens with a scene plucked from the film's third act that smacks of having been moved up to pacify audiences too restless for a slow build."

References

External links

 
 
 
 
 
 
 

Body Snatchers films
2007 films
2007 horror films
2000s science fiction horror films
2000s thriller films
Alien invasions in films
Remakes of American films
American horror thriller films
American science fiction horror films
American science fiction thriller films
2000s Russian-language films
Films scored by John Ottman
Films directed by Oliver Hirschbiegel
Films directed by James McTeigue
Films produced by Joel Silver
Films set in 2006
Films set in 2007
Films set in Washington, D.C.
Films shot in Baltimore
Films shot in Washington, D.C.
Films shot in Los Angeles
American post-apocalyptic films
Silver Pictures films
Films about viral outbreaks
Village Roadshow Pictures films
Films about extraterrestrial life
Vertigo Entertainment films
Warner Bros. films
2000s English-language films
2000s American films